The men's ISSF 50 meter pistol event at the 2012 Olympic Games took place on 5 August 2012 at the Royal Artillery Barracks. There were 38 competitors from 27 nations. The event was won by Jin Jong-oh of South Korea, the second of his three consecutive victories in the free pistol. He was the first (and, since the event has been discontinued, the only) shooter to win two individual free pistol gold medals. It was his third medal in the event (including a silver in 2004), making him the fourth man to earn three free pistol medals. His countryman Choi Young-rae took silver, the first time since 1976 that a nation had finished 1–2 in the event. Chinese shooter Wang Zhiwei received bronze.

Background

This was the 23rd appearance of the ISSF 50 meter pistol event. The event was held at every Summer Olympics from 1896 to 1920 (except 1904, when no shooting events were held) and from 1936 to 2016; it was nominally open to women from 1968 to 1980, although very few women participated these years. A separate women's event would be introduced in 1984. 1896 and 1908 were the only Games in which the distance was not 50 metres; the former used 30 metres and the latter 50 yards.

Five of the eight finalists from the 2008 Games returned: gold medalist (and 2004 silver medalist) Jin Jong-oh of South Korea, bronze medalist Vladimir Isakov of Russia, fourth-place finisher Oleg Omelchuk of Ukraine, fifth-place finisher Pavol Kopp of Slovakia, and seventh-place finisher Damir Mikec of Serbia. The 2010 world championship podium was Tomoyuki Matsuda of Japan, Lee Dae-myung of South Korea, and Vyacheslav Podlesnyy of Kazakhstan; Matsuda and Podlesnyy competed in London but the South Korean pair was Jin and Choi Young-rae. Mikec was the No. 1 seed.

Iceland made its debut in the event. The United States made its 21st appearance, most of any nation, having missed only the 1900 event and the boycotted 1980 Games.

Jin used a Morini CM84E.

Qualification

Each National Olympic Committee (NOC) could enter up to two shooters if the NOC earned enough quota sports or had enough crossover-qualified shooters. To compete, a shooter needed a quota spot and to achieve a Minimum Qualification Score (MQS). Once a shooter was using a quota spot in any shooting event, they could enter any other shooting event for which they had achieved the MQS as well (a crossover qualification). There were 18 quota spots available for the free pistol: 4 at the 2010 World Championship, 8 at the 2011 World Cup events (2 spots at each of 4 events), 5 for continental champions (2 each for Europe and Americas, 1 for Asia), and a Tripartite Commission invitation. There were also 2 re-allocated places and 18 double starters (primarily from the 10 metre air pistol event).

Competition format

The competition featured two rounds, qualifying and final. The qualifying round was the same as the previous competitions: each shooter fired 60 shots, in 6 series of 10 shots each, at a distance of 50 metres. The target was round, 50 centimetres in diameter, with 10 scoring rings. Scoring for each shot was up to 10 points, in increments of 1 point. The maximum score possible was 600 points. The top 8 shooters advanced to a final; ties necessary for qualifying were broken by an additional series. They shot an additional series of 10 shots, with the score added to their qualifying round score to give a 70-shot total. The 1996 competition had added decimal scoring to the final; shots could score up to 10.9 for the final. The total maximum was therefore 709.0. Any pistol was permitted.

Records

Prior to this competition, the existing world and Olympic records were as follows.

No new world or Olympic records were set during the competition.

Schedule

Results

Qualifying

Final

Choi had a 7-point lead over Jin (5th place in qualifying) and a 3-point lead over Wang going into the finals; Jin never hit lower than 9.5 in first 9 finals shots to close the gap while Wang fell to nearly 3 points out of second. Choi still held a 1.6-point lead over Jin going into the last shot, but scored only 8.1 while Jin put his final shot in the 10-ring to pass him and repeat as gold medalist.

References

Shooting at the 2012 Summer Olympics
Men's 2012
Men's events at the 2012 Summer Olympics